Giriyal is a village in Dharwad district of Karnataka, India.

Demographics 
As of the 2011 Census of India there were 236 households in Giriyal and a total population of 1,369 consisting of 716 males and 653 females. There were 198 children ages 0-6.

References

Villages in Dharwad district